The women's discus throw event at the 2003 All-Africa Games was held on October 12.

Results

References

Discus